Gérard Fromanger (6 September 1939 – 18 June 2021) was a French visual artist. A painter who also employed collage, sculpture, photography, cinema, and lithography, he was associated with the French artistic movement of the 1960s and 1970s, called Figuration Narrative (new figurative representation), somewhat like pop art. Fromanger was alsi associated with photorealism.

Fromanger studied at the École des Beaux-Arts in Paris, where his first solo exhibition was held in 1966. Souffles, his large translucent "half-balloon" street sculptures, attracted attention in 1968. He also collaborated with Jean-Luc Godard to make the short "Film-tract 1968". Urban life and the consumer society are themes well represented in his work.

The Nouvelle Figuration movement (sometimes called figuration narrative or représentation narrative) is considered to have been a reaction against abstract art, with a more political slant than American pop art. Fromanger has been described as a social critic who takes a political position without neglecting the poetic dimension.

Michel Foucault, a friend of Fromanger's, wrote about his work in Photogenic Painting.

In 2005, a retrospective exhibition, Gérard Fromanger: rétrospective 1962–2005, was shown at various galleries in France, Belgium, Luxembourg, and Switzerland. Fromanger lived and worked in both Siena and Paris.

Books
Bernard Ceysson Gérard Fromanger (Catalogue for retrospective exhibition 2005)
Gilles Deleuze and Michel Foucault Photogenic Painting (2000)
Alain Jouffroy Gérard Fromanger (1973)
Serge July Fromanger (2000)

References
Interview with Fromanger, plus pictures and videos
Centre Pompidou
French National Library
Nouvelle Figuration

External links
Interview with Fromanger
Fromanger and Jouffroy
Souffles
Portrait of Gérard Fromanger by Braun-Vega (1984)

1939 births
2021 deaths
People from Yvelines
20th-century French painters
20th-century French male artists
French male painters
21st-century French painters
21st-century French male artists
Commandeurs of the Ordre des Arts et des Lettres